The Chinese Academy of Geological Sciences (CAGS) is an institution that engages in geoscience research in the People's Republic of China. The academy was established in 1956 and reorganized in 1999. Administratively it is under the PRC Ministry of Land and Resources.

Research

The academy conducts scientific research on various aspects of geology and geophysics, such as the analytic and exploration techniques of mineral deposit, hydrogeology, engineering geology, environmental geology, karst geology, exploration geophysics and geochemistry.

It is also active in research on paleontology, and was involved in identification of new dinosaurs, including Zhenyuanlong, Xixiasaurus, and a new type of tyrannosaur Qianzhousaurus. as well as other animals such as Castorocauda and Rugosodon.

Affiliated institutes
The following institutes are affiliated with the Chinese Academy of Geological Sciences:
Institute of Hydrogeology and Environmental Geology (IHEG), CAGS, China
Institute of Geophysical and Geochemical Exploration	
Institute of Geomechanics, CAGS, China
Institute of Geology, CAGS, China
Institute of Mineral Resources (IMR), CAGS, China
National Research Center for Geoanalysis
Tianjin Institute of Geology and Mineral Resources (TIGMR), CAGS, China
Institute of Karst Geology, CAGS

See also
 Chinese Academy of Sciences
 International Union of Geological Sciences — currently headquartered here.

References

External links
 

National geological agencies
Research institutes in China
Scientific organizations based in China
Geology of China
Paleontology in China
Organizations based in Beijing
Research institutes established in 1956
Scientific organizations established in 1956
1956 establishments in China
International Union of Geological Sciences